Braintree Freeport railway station is on the Braintree Branch Line in the East of England, serving the Braintree Village shopping centre (formerly known as Braintree Freeport). Its three-letter station code is BTP. The platform has an operational length for eight-coach trains.

The station is managed by Greater Anglia, which also operates all trains serving it.

History
The station was opened on 8 November 1999. There is a single, unstaffed platform with a shelter and a self-service ticket machine but there is no station building or other facilities.

Despite having 1,500 free car-parking spaces for the shopping centre and there being no pay machines on site, a charge has been implemented for long-stay car parking beyond six hours for which users pay via phone or online.

Services

On Sundays services terminate at Witham and passengers travelling on towards London must change for a connecting train.

Services are typically formed by Class 720 electric multiple units and Class 321/322’s.

References

External links 
Report on proposed footbridge from Essex County Council

 

Railway stations in Essex
DfT Category F2 stations
Railway stations opened by Railtrack
Railway stations in Great Britain opened in 1999
Greater Anglia franchise railway stations
Braintree, Essex